The 1908 Utah gubernatorial election was held on November 3, 1908. Republican nominee William Spry defeated Democratic nominee Jesse Knight with 47.45% of the vote.

General election

Candidates
Major party candidates
William Spry, Republican 
Jesse Knight, Democratic

Other candidates
John A. Street, American
V. R. Bohman, Socialist

Results

References

1908
Utah
Gubernatorial